Team John Village Automotive (Team JVA) is a British motor racing team founded by the former Formula Ford champion John Village in 1980 and headquartered in Chesterfield, England.

History 
The team was founded as a garage and race preparation business. In the 1980s JVA ran in Formula Ford, winning the Spanish championship with Victor López Ferraz and at international level, by winning the Formula Ford Festival with Vincenzo Sospiri in 1988.

In the 1990s, the team entered Formula Vauxhall Lotus. Kelvin Burt won the 1991 championship and Oliver Gavin was runner-up in 1992. JVA ran also in Formula Vauxhall Junior and won the championship in 1996 with Tim Mullen.

Team JVA have been involved in Italian Formula 3000/Euro Formula 3000 since 1999, at first in collaboration with Edenbridge Racing, Arden Team Russia, B&C Competition, and on its own since 2002. In 2005, it ran in the rival Pro Series (predecessor to the current International Formula Master).

Since 2005–06, the team has worked with A1 Team Canada in A1 Grand Prix.

Series results 

 D.C. = Drivers' Championship position, T.C. = Teams' Championship position.

References

External links 
 team-jva.com, Team JVA official website

British auto racing teams
A1 Grand Prix racing teams
International Formula Masters teams
Auto GP teams
Auto racing teams established in 1980

British Formula Renault teams